Joseph Daye (born 2 February 1990) is an Australian rules footballer who last played for Gold Coast in the Australian Football League.

Early career 
Raised in Brisbane, Daye is a graduate of the AIS/AFL Academy. He hails from AFLQ club Zillmere Eagles and is a product of the 2007–08 Australia Post Queensland U18 side who also represented his state at under-15 and under-16 levels.

AFL career 
He was picked up by Gold Coast as a zone selection. He made his debut on 7 May 2011 against the Brisbane Lions.

Statistics
 

|- style="background-color: #EAEAEA"
! scope="row" style="text-align:center" | 2011
|
| 19 || 4 || 1 || 2 || 21 || 18 || 39 || 9 || 13 || 0.3 || 0.5 || 5.3 || 4.5 || 9.8 || 2.3 || 3.3
|- class="sortbottom"
! colspan=3| Career
! 4
! 1
! 2
! 21
! 18
! 39
! 9
! 13
! 0.3
! 0.5
! 5.3
! 4.5
! 9.8
! 2.3
! 3.3
|}

Personal life 
Daye is the godson of Essendon great Michael Long.

References

External links

Gold Coast Profile

1990 births
Living people
Gold Coast Football Club players
Australian rules footballers from Queensland
Sportspeople from Brisbane
Place of birth missing (living people)
Aspley Football Club players